Science Park or Pak Shek Kok is a proposed MTR station which may be built in Pak Shek Kok, New Territories, Hong Kong. The station would be on the East Rail line between University and Tai Po Market stations, serving the Hong Kong Science Park. In 2021, Chief Executive Carrie Lam invited the MTR Corporation for the construction of a station at the site of the Hong Kong Education University's sports centre. In the Chief Executive's 2022 policy address, it was stated that the station would be commissioned by 2033.

It is thought that a possible reason for constructing the station could be to shorten travelling distance and time between Science Park and Tai Po; currently, the only way to get to Tai Po Market using only public transport is by taking the 272K to University station and then the MTR to Tai Po Market station. Walking to University station from Science Park takes around 20 minutes.

References

Proposed buildings and structures in Hong Kong
MTR stations in the New Territories
Pak Shek Kok
Proposed railway stations in Hong Kong